Phayttos was a town in Pelasgiotis, ancient Thessaly, closely set with Atrax and Larissa. An inscription to Artemis dating from the 3rd century BCE was found here.

Its site in near the modern village of Zarkon.

References

Populated places in ancient Thessaly
Former populated places in Greece
Pelasgiotis